Ramz-e-Ishq was a 2019 Pakistani romantic drama television series, written by Siraj ul Haque and produced by Abdullah Kadwani and Asad Qureshi under their banner 7th Sky Entertainment. It starred Mikaal Zulfiqar, Hiba Bukhari and Kiran Haq.

Mikaal Zulfiqar and Kiran Haq made their fifth on-screen appearance by this serial after their appearances in Tum Meray Hi Rehna, Maan, Sangat and Tum Mere Kya Ho.

Plot

Roshni is the obedient, good-natured and responsible daughter of Wajahat Ali and Khadija who sacrifices her love for Rayan in favor of the husband chosen for her by her parents. When Wajahat passes away in an unexpected accident, Roshni’s estranged grandfather Hashmat Ali becomes her guardian. Advised by Safia, Wajahat’s sister who secretly resented her brother for her own failed marriage, Hashmat cancels Roshni’s upcoming marriage. Respectful of her grandfather and wanting to heal her family’s old differences, Roshni sacrifices her own choice once again and agrees to marry Umar, the son of the family’s munshi.

Instead of being embraced as a family member, things go from bad to worse for Roshni when she and her husband are treated extremely poorly by her spiteful aunt and her daughter Rania. Will Roshni continue to suffer at the hands of her own grandfather and aunt? Will Rayan, Roshni’s cousin  end up marrying Rania? Or will Roshni be able to get her life back on track somehow and overcome the obstacles that have been put in her path by her very own family? Or will she back down?

Cast
Mikaal Zulfiqar as Rayaan
Hiba Bukhari as Roshni
Kiran Haq as Raania
Faryal Mehmood as Sadia
Abid Ali as Rayaan's grandfather
Nida Mumtaz as Safiya
Aijaz Aslam as Wajahat Ali (Dead)
Zainab Qayyum as Khadija Begum (Dead)
Gohar Rasheed as Umer
Shabbir Jan as Rayaan's father
Azra Mohyeddin as Ayesha, Rayaan's mother
Shaista Jabeen as Umer's mother (Dead)
Manzoor Qureshi as Sadia's father

Awards and nominations

References

External links
Official website

Pakistani drama television series
Comedy-drama television series
Urdu-language television shows
2019 Pakistani television series debuts
Geo TV original programming